James Graham (17 April 1892 – 28 November 1957) was an Australian rules footballer who played with South Melbourne in the Victorian Football League (VFL).

Graham spent just one season at South Melbourne, after coming to the club from Williamstown Juniors. He was, however, a member of a South Melbourne premiership team, playing as a back pocket defender in the 1918 VFL Grand Final.

He later played for Port Melbourne in the Victorian Football Association.

References

External links
 

1892 births
1957 deaths
Australian rules footballers from Victoria (Australia)
Sydney Swans players
Sydney Swans Premiership players
Port Melbourne Football Club players
One-time VFL/AFL Premiership players